Mathews is a census-designated place (CDP) on Bayou Lafourche in Lafourche Parish, Louisiana, United States. The population was 2,273 in 2020. It is part of the Houma–Bayou Cane–Thibodaux metropolitan statistical area.

History
On August 20, 2007, school paraprofessional Amy Hebert fatally stabbed her children, Camille Catherine Hebert, age 9; and Braxton John Hebert, age 7; and the family dog. She was sentenced to life in prison.

Geography
Mathews is located at  (29.683825, -90.550470).

According to the United States Census Bureau, the CDP has a total area of 4.0 square miles (10.3 km), all land.

It is in the central part of the parish and is bordered by Lockport and Raceland.

Demographics

As of the 2020 United States census, there were 2,273 people, 1,067 households, and 637 families residing in the CDP.

Government and infrastructure
The Lafourche Parish Mathews Government Complex is in Mathews.

The U.S. Postal Service operates the Mathews Post Office in Mathews.

Education
Mathews is within the Lafourche Parish School District.

Residents east of Highway 308, south of 4839 Highway 308 (Matthews Baptist Church) and residents west of Highway 1, south of 4901 Highway 1 are zoned to Lockport Lower Elementary School, Lockport Upper Elementary School, and Lockport Middle School in Lockport. Other residents are zoned to Raceland Lower Elementary School, Raceland Upper Elementary School, and Raceland Middle School in Raceland. Central Lafourche High School is in the town.

Lafourche Parish is in the service area of Fletcher Technical Community College.

References

Census-designated places in Lafourche Parish, Louisiana
Census-designated places in Louisiana
Census-designated places in Houma – Thibodaux metropolitan area